Taleb (also Romanized as Ţāleb) is a village in Charuymaq-e Jonubegharbi Rural District, in the Central District of Charuymaq County, East Azerbaijan Province, Iran.

Population
At the 2006 census, its population was 84, in 19 families.

References 

Populated places in Charuymaq County